Asian Highway 30 or AH30 is a route located in Russia, running  from Ussuriysk, Primorsky Krai to Chita, Zabaykalsky Krai. Khabarovsk to Chita section of this Asian highway is named after Amur river as Amur Highway .

Route 

: Ussuriysk - Khabarovsk 
: Khabarovsk - Birobidzhan - Arkhara - Svobodny - Never - Chita

Junctions
  near Ussuriysk
  near Belogorsk
  near Chita

See also
 Asian Highway 6
 List of Asian Highways

References

External links 
  Treaty on Asian Highways with routes

Asian Highway Network
Roads in Russia